Adrian Pllotschi (born 26 October 1959) in Mihail Kogălniceanu, is a former Romanian rugby union football player and currently coach. He played as a wing. He is the uncle of the Romanian-Austrian Miss World 2014 contestant for Austria Julia Furdea.

Club career
Pllotschi played for Farul Constanța during his career.

International career
Pllotschi gathered 3 caps for Romania, from his debut in 1987 to his last game in 1990.  He was a member of his national side for the 1st Rugby World Cup in 1987 and played in the group match against Scotland, at Dunedin, on 2 June 1987.

Honours
Farul Constanța
 Cupa României: 1990-91, 1993–94

References

External links
Adrian Plotschii International Statistics at ESPN

1959 births
Living people
Romanian rugby union players
Romania international rugby union players
RCJ Farul Constanța players
Rugby union wings
People from Constanța County